The Gulf Coast League Rangers, or GCL Rangers were a minor league baseball club in the Gulf Coast League between 1973 and 2002. The club was consistently competitive winning eight league championships and seven division titles, while only posting five losing seasons. The gteam originally played in Sarasota, Florida until 1987, when it relocated south to Port Charlotte, Florida. The team left the Gulf Coast League in 2003 for the Arizona League as exists today as the Arizona League Rangers.

Season-by-season

Baseball teams established in 1973
Baseball teams disestablished in 2002
Defunct Florida Complex League teams
Texas Rangers minor league affiliates
Charlotte County, Florida
1973 establishments in Florida
2002 disestablishments in Florida
Defunct baseball teams in Florida